Howraghat (IPA: ˈhɑʊrəˌgɑːt) is a town in the Karbi Anglong district of the Indian state of Assam. It is home to many indigenous communities mainly Karbi, Dimasa Kachari, Tiwa (Lalung) Kachari, Bodo Kachari, etc.

Etymology
The name "Howraghat" came from Karbi words 'Hawar Kehat' meaning crossing border. The word became distorted later as Howraghat.

Demographics
 India census, Howraghat had a population of 95649. Males constitute 58% of the population and females 42%. Howraghat has an average literacy rate of 80%, higher than the national average of 59.5%: male literacy is 85%, and female literacy is 73%. In Howraghat, 11% of the population is under 6 years of age.

Education
Atur Kimi English School
Howraghat College
Howraghat Higher Secondary School
Howraghat English Medium High School
Howraghat Town Girls High School
National English School
Pan Engti ME School
Srimanta Shankardeva Vidyalay
Shankar dev shisu vidya Niketan
Kidzee pre-school
Clirso Global school

Politics
Howraghat is part of Autonomous District (Lok Sabha constituency).

References

Cities and towns in Karbi Anglong district